FC Basel 1893 (Fussball Club Basel 1893) is a Swiss football club based in Basel, Switzerland. This is a list of footballers who have played for FC Basel since the club was first founded.

For a list of FC Basel players with a Wikipedia article see Category:FC Basel players. For the current squad see the main FC Basel article or the current 2022–23 season.

The club Fussball Club Basel was founded on 15 November 1893. The club colours from the first day on were red and blue. FC Basel's first game was on 26 November 1893 against itself, an internal match between two ad hoc formed FCB teams against each other. Two weeks later FCB had their first official appearance, in a game against a team formed by students from the high school gymnastic club. FCB won 2–0. In the early days, the club's team played only friendly matches, for example the local derby against BSC Old Boys (founded as FC Old Boys Basel in 1894) and also against Grasshopper Club Zurich (founded in 1886). Basel did not compete in the first (unofficial) Swiss football championship which was held 1897–1898. However, they did contest in the second Serie A championship 1898–1899 which was organized by the Swiss Football Association.

Legend
Table headers
 Nationality – If a player played international football, the country/countries he played for are shown. Otherwise, the player's nationality is given as their country of birth.
 Life – Date of birth and date of death (if known).
 Position – Key to positions is shown below the list.
 Basel career – The year of the player's first appearance for FC Basel and the year of his last appearance.
 League appearances and goals – Appearances and goals are for first-team Swiss League matches only. Substitute appearances are included. 
 All appearances and goals – All appearances and goals, including League, Cup and European competition (all games recognised by the UEFA, these being: Champions League, Europa League, Conference League, UEFA Cup, Cup Winners' Cup, Intertoto Cup, Inter-Cities Fairs Cup, Rappen-Cup or Alpencup) but not so called friendly or test games.

NB: Players who are still active for FC Basel are marked in grey.

List of players

Key to positions

See also
 FC Basel
 History of FC Basel
 List of FC Basel seasons
 :Category:FC Basel
 :Category:FC Basel players

Notes

Footnotes

References

Sources
 Rotblau: Jahrbuch Saison 2014/2015. Publisher: FC Basel Marketing AG. 
 Die ersten 125 Jahre. Publisher: Josef Zindel im Friedrich Reinhardt Verlag, Basel. 
 Verein "Basler Fussballarchiv" Homepage
(NB: Despite all efforts, the editors of these books and the authors in "Basler Fussballarchiv" have failed to be able to identify all the players, their date and place of birth or date and place of death, who played in the games during the early years of FC Basel)
 Rotblau.ch Statistik Website
 FC Basel Fan club website
 http://www.football.ch

External links
 Official Website

Basel
Association football player non-biographical articles